The 1989 Oakland Athletics season saw the A's finish in first place in the American League West division, with a record of 99 wins and 63 losses, seven games in front of the Kansas City Royals. Oakland dominated the American League, earning their second consecutive AL West title, as well as marking the second straight year in which they finished with the best record in all of baseball.  A's pitcher Dave Stewart recorded his third straight season of earning 20 or more wins while Rickey Henderson put on a dazzling offensive performance in the postseason as he approached the prospects of landing a three million dollar contract for the following season. The team defeated the Toronto Blue Jays in five games in the ALCS, then swept their cross-Bay rivals, the San Francisco Giants, in an earthquake-marred World Series.  The Athletics looked to be a future dynasty by the close of the 1989 season.

Offseason

November 28, 1988: Mike Moore signs as a free agent with the Oakland Athletics.  
November 30, 1988: Billy Beane was signed as a free agent with the Oakland Athletics.

Regular season
Ken Griffey Jr. made his major league baseball debut on April 3, 1989, in a game against the Oakland Athletics.
On August 22, 1989, Nolan Ryan struck out Rickey Henderson for the 5,000th strikeout in his career.

Season standings

Record vs. opponents

Notable transactions
April 6, 1989: Troy Afenir was traded by the Houston Astros to the Oakland Athletics for Matt Sinatro.
April 6, 1989: Mike Norris was signed as a free agent with the Oakland Athletics.
May 27, 1989: Jamie Quirk was signed as a free agent with the Oakland Athletics.
June 5, 1989: Mike Mohler was drafted by the Oakland Athletics in the 42nd round of the 1989 amateur draft. Player signed August 18, 1989.
June 21, 1989: Rickey Henderson was traded by the New York Yankees to the Oakland Athletics for Greg Cadaret, Eric Plunk, and Luis Polonia.
July 24, 1989: Jamie Quirk was released by the Oakland Athletics.
July 31, 1989: Glenn Hubbard was released by the Oakland Athletics.
August 30, 1989: Ken Phelps was traded by the New York Yankees to the Oakland Athletics for Scott Holcomb (minors).

Roster

Game log

|- style="text-align:center;background-color:#bbffbb"
| 1 || April 3 || Mariners || 3–2 || Stewart (1–0) || Langston (0–1) || Eckersley (1) || 46,163 || 1–0
|- style="text-align:center;background-color:#bbffbb"
| 2 || April 5 || Mariners || 11–1 || Welch (1–0) || Bankhead (0–1) || || 16,045 || 2–0
|- style="text-align:center;background-color:#bbffbb"
| 3 || April 6 || Mariners || 11–3 || Davis (1–0) || Campbell (0–1) || Burns (1) || 19,087 || 3–0
|- style="text-align:center;background-color:#ffbbbb"
| 4 || April 7 || White Sox || 7–1 || Long (1–0) || C. Young (0–1) || Jones (1) || 20,585 || 3–1
|- style="text-align:center;background-color:#ffbbbb"
| 5 || April 8 || White Sox || 7–4 || Pérez (1–0) || Moore (0–1) || Thigpen (1) || 32,881 || 3–2
|- style="text-align:center;background-color:#bbffbb"
| 6 || April 9 || White Sox || 4–2 || Stewart (2–0) || Reuss (1–1) || Eckersley (2) || 45,110 || 4–2
|- style="text-align:center;background-color:#bbffbb"
| 7 || April 10 || @ Angels || 4–0 || Welch (2–0) || Finley (1–1) || || 23,820 || 5–2
|- style="text-align:center;background-color:#ffbbbb"
| 8 || April 11 || @ Angels || 7–1 || Blyleven (1–0) || Davis (1–1) || || 23,322 || 5–3
|- style="text-align:center;background-color:#ffbbbb"
| 9 || April 12 || @ Angels || 5–0 || McCaskill (2–0) || C. Young (0–2) || || 24,650 || 5–4
|- style="text-align:center;background-color:#bbffbb"
| 10 || April 13 || @ Angels || 5–0 || Moore (1–1) || Abbott (0–2) || || 24,137 || 6–4
|- style="text-align:center;background-color:#bbffbb"
| 11 || April 14 || @ White Sox || 7–4 || Stewart (3–0) || Pérez (1–1) || || 37,950 || 7–4
|- style="text-align:center;background-color:#ffbbbb"
| 12 || April 15 || @ White Sox || 7–4 || Reuss (2–1) || Welch (2–1) || Thigpen (3) || 15,748 || 7–5
|- style="text-align:center;background-color:#bbffbb"
| 13 || April 16 || @ White Sox || 3–2 || Eckersley (1–0) || King (0–3) || || 20,969 || 8–5
|- style="text-align:center;background-color:#ffbbbb"
| 14 || April 17 || @ Mariners || 7–2 || Hanson (2–1) || C. Young (0–3) || || 14,827 || 8–6
|- style="text-align:center;background-color:#bbffbb"
| 15 || April 18 || @ Mariners || 5–3 || Plunk (1–0) || Reed (1–2) || Eckersley (3) || 9,670 || 9–6
|- style="text-align:center;background-color:#bbffbb"
| 16 || April 19 || @ Mariners || 7–5 || Stewart (4–0) || Langston (2–2) || Eckersley (4) || 11,328 || 10–6
|- style="text-align:center;background-color:#bbffbb"
| 17 || April 21 || Angels || 10–6 || Welch (3–1) || Finley (2–2) || Honeycutt (1) || 26,903 || 11–6
|- style="text-align:center;background-color:#bbffbb"
| 18 || April 22 || Angels || 4–3 || C. Young (1–3) || Blyleven (2–1) || Eckersley (5) || 33,172 || 12–6
|- style="text-align:center;background-color:#bbffbb"
| 19 || April 23 || Angels || 2–0 || Moore (2–1) || McCaskill (3–1) || Eckersley (6) || 25,681 || 13–6
|- style="text-align:center;background-color:#bbffbb"
| 20 || April 24 || Blue Jays || 5–4 || Nelson (1–0) || Henke (1–2) || || 25,099 || 14–6
|- style="text-align:center;background-color:#bbffbb"
| 21 || April 25 || Blue Jays || 3–1 || Davis (2–1) || Cerutti (0–1) || Eckersley (7) || 12,437 || 15–6
|- style="text-align:center;background-color:#ffbbbb"
| 22 || April 26 || Orioles || 2–1 || Bautista (2–2) || Welch (3–2) || Olson (2) || 17,060 || 15–7
|- style="text-align:center;background-color:#bbffbb"
| 23 || April 27 || Orioles || 9–4 || Burns (1–0) || Thurmond (0–1) || || 21,423 || 16–7
|- style="text-align:center;background-color:#bbffbb"
| 24 || April 28 || Tigers || 2–1 || Moore (3–1) || Gibson (1–1) || Eckersley (8) || 26,594 || 17–7
|- style="text-align:center;background-color:#bbffbb"
| 25 || April 29 || Tigers || 3–2 || Stewart (5–0) || Alexander (3–1) || || 36,313 || 18–7
|- style="text-align:center;background-color:#ffbbbb"
| 26 || April 30 || Tigers || 7–2 || Tanana (2–3) || Davis (2–2) || Hernández (5) || 36,009 || 18–8

|- style="text-align:center;background-color:#bbffbb"
| 27 || May 2 || @ Blue Jays || 8–5 || Honeycutt (1–0) || Ward (1–4) || Plunk (1) || 23,439 || 19–8
|- style="text-align:center;background-color:#ffbbbb"
| 28 || May 3 || @ Blue Jays || 2–0 || Flanagan (2–1) || Moore (3–2) || || 22,370 || 19–9
|- style="text-align:center;background-color:#bbffbb"
| 29 || May 5 || @ Tigers || 5–3 || Stewart (6–0) || Tanana (2–4) || Eckersley (9) || 18,482 || 20–9
|- style="text-align:center;background-color:#ffbbbb"
| 30 || May 6 || @ Tigers || 6–3 || Morris (1–6) || Davis (2–3) || Hernández (6) || 32,404 || 20–10
|- style="text-align:center;background-color:#bbffbb"
| 31 || May 7 || @ Tigers || 5–4 || Welch (4–2) || Hudson (0–3) || Eckersley (10) || 20,391 || 21–10
|- style="text-align:center;background-color:#bbffbb"
| 32 || May 8 || @ Orioles || 6–1 || Moore (4–2) || Milacki (1–3) || || 19,159 || 22–10
|- style="text-align:center;background-color:#ffbbbb"
| 33 || May 11 || @ Orioles || 6–2 || Ballard (6–1) || Stewart (6–1) || || 1,201 || 22–11
|- style="text-align:center;background-color:#bbffbb"
| 34 || May 12 || Brewers || 5–4 || Burns (2–0) || Plesac (1–2) || || 30,743 || 23–11
|- style="text-align:center;background-color:#bbffbb"
| 35 || May 13 || Brewers || 4–3 || Welch (5–2) || Bosio (5–2) || Eckersley (11) || 33,053 || 24–11
|- style="text-align:center;background-color:#ffbbbb"
| 36 || May 14 || Brewers || 2–1 || Crim (2–2) || Moore (4–3) || Plesac (6) || 26,989 || 24–12
|- style="text-align:center;background-color:#bbffbb"
| 37 || May 15 || Brewers || 12–2 || Stewart (7–1) || August (2–5) || || 25,974 || 25–12
|- style="text-align:center;background-color:#ffbbbb"
| 38 || May 16 || Yankees || 3–2 || Parker (1–0) || C. Young (1–4) || Righetti (6) || 25,852 || 25–13
|- style="text-align:center;background-color:#bbffbb"
| 39 || May 17 || Yankees || 8–3 || Davis (3–3) || Dotson (1–1) || Eckersley (12) || 24,505 || 26–13
|- style="text-align:center;background-color:#bbffbb"
| 40 || May 18 || Yankees || 6–2 || Welch (6–2) || John (2–7) || Burns (2) || 40,758 || 27–13
|- style="text-align:center;background-color:#ffbbbb"
| 41 || May 19 || Red Sox || 7 – 4  || Stanley (2–1) || Nelson (1–1) || || 40,382 || 27–14
|- style="text-align:center;background-color:#bbffbb"
| 42 || May 20 || Red Sox || 6–3 || Stewart (8–1) || Gardner (1–4) || Eckersley (13) || 43,427 || 28–14
|- style="text-align:center;background-color:#bbffbb"
| 43 || May 21 || Red Sox || 5–4 || Burns (3–0) || Clemens (5–3) || Eckersley (14) || 44,505 || 29–14
|- style="text-align:center;background-color:#ffbbbb"
| 44 || May 23 || @ Brewers || 9–1 || Bosio (6–3) || Welch (6–3) || || 13,882 || 29–15
|- style="text-align:center;background-color:#bbffbb"
| 45 || May 24 || @ Brewers || 6–2 || Moore (5–3) || Birkbeck (0–3) || || 13,932 || 30–15
|- style="text-align:center;background-color:#ffbbbb"
| 46 || May 25 || @ Brewers || 4–1 || Clutterbuck (2–1) || Stewart (8–2) || Plesac (9) || 18,898 || 30–16
|- style="text-align:center;background-color:#bbffbb"
| 47 || May 26 || @ Yankees || 4–0 || Burns (4–0) || Hawkins (4–6) || || 28,726 || 31–16
|- style="text-align:center;background-color:#bbffbb"
| 48 || May 27 || @ Yankees || 3–0 || C. Young (2–4) || LaPoint (5–3) || Honeycutt (2) || 28,111 || 32–16
|- style="text-align:center;background-color:#bbffbb"
| 49 || May 28 || @ Yankees || 4–3 || Moore (6–3) || Parker (2–1) || Honeycutt (3) || 38,527 || 33–16
|- style="text-align:center;background-color:#ffbbbb"
| 50 || May 29 || @ Red Sox || 3 – 2  || Smith (3–1) || Welch (6–4) || || 33,344 || 33–17
|- style="text-align:center;background-color:#bbffbb"
| 51 || May 30 || @ Red Sox || 4–2 || Stewart (9–2) || Smithson (2–4) || Honeycutt (4) || 31,407 || 34–17
|- style="text-align:center;background-color:#ffbbbb"
| 52 || May 31 || @ Red Sox || 4 – 3  || Smith (4–1) || Plunk (1–1) || || 33,510 || 34–18

|- style="text-align:center;background-color:#ffbbbb"
| 53 || June 2 || Indians || 5–3 || Swindell (6–1) || Moore (6–4) || Jones (12) || 28,052 || 34–19
|- style="text-align:center;background-color:#bbffbb"
| 54 || June 3 || Indians || 7–0 || Welch (7–4) || Candiotti (6–3) || || 35,466 || 35–19
|- style="text-align:center;background-color:#bbffbb"
| 55 || June 4 || Indians || 4–0 || Stewart (10–2) || Farrell (3–6) || || 34,610 || 36–19
|- style="text-align:center;background-color:#ffbbbb"
| 56 || June 5 || Twins || 2–1 || Oliveras (3–2) || C. Young (2–5) || Reardon (9) || 34,320 || 36–20
|- style="text-align:center;background-color:#bbffbb"
| 57 || June 6 || Twins || 1–0 || Moore (7–4) || Anderson (6–4) || || 23,505 || 37–20
|- style="text-align:center;background-color:#bbffbb"
| 58 || June 7 || Twins || 3–2 || Welch (8–4) || Viola (4–8) || Burns (3) || 27,396 || 38–20
|- style="text-align:center;background-color:#ffbbbb"
| 59 || June 9 || @ Rangers || 11–8 || Guante (4–3) || Nelson (1–2) || Russell (14) || 35,799 || 38–21
|- style="text-align:center;background-color:#bbffbb"
| 60 || June 10 || @ Rangers || 5–1 || Davis (4–3) || Witt (5–6) || || 40,796 || 39–21
|- style="text-align:center;background-color:#bbffbb"
| 61 || June 11 || @ Rangers || 5–1 || Moore (8–4) || Brown (5–3) || Nelson (1) || 32,127 || 40–21
|- style="text-align:center;background-color:#ffbbbb"
| 62 || June 12 || @ Royals || 2 – 1  || Gordon (8–2) || Burns (4–1) || || 39,387 || 40–22
|- style="text-align:center;background-color:#ffbbbb"
| 63 || June 13 || @ Royals || 5–3 || Appier (1–1) || C. Young (2–6) || Farr (14) || 29,816 || 40–23
|- style="text-align:center;background-color:#bbffbb"
| 64 || June 14 || @ Royals || 2–1 || Stewart (11–2) || Leibrandt (4–7) || Honeycutt (5) || 31,087 || 41–23
|- style="text-align:center;background-color:#bbffbb"
| 65 || June 16 || @ Orioles || 7–5 || Davis (5–3) || Holton (2–5) || Honeycutt (6) || || 42–23
|- style="text-align:center;background-color:#ffbbbb"
| 66 || June 16 || @ Orioles || 5–1 || Tibbs (3–0) || Moore (8–5) || || 40,707 || 42–24
|- style="text-align:center;background-color:#ffbbbb"
| 67 || June 17 || @ Orioles || 4–2 || Bautista (3–4) || M. Young (0–1) || Olson (8) || 36,431 || 42–25
|- style="text-align:center;background-color:#ffbbbb"
| 68 || June 18 || @ Orioles || 4–2 || Schmidt (7–5) || C. Young (2–7) || Weston (1) || 46,541 || 42–26
|- style="text-align:center;background-color:#ffbbbb"
| 69 || June 19 || Tigers || 6–4 || Tanana (7–6) || Stewart (11–3) || Henneman (1) || 38,607 || 43–26
|- style="text-align:center;background-color:#bbffbb"
| 70 || June 20 || Tigers || 6–4 || Nelson (2–2) || Havens (0–1) || Burns (4) || 30,184 || 44–26
|- style="text-align:center;background-color:#bbffbb"
| 71 || June 21 || Tigers || 6–3 || Moore (9–5) || Schwabe (1–3) || Honeycutt (7) || 28,654 || 45–26
|- style="text-align:center;background-color:#ffbbbb"
| 72 || June 22 || Blue Jays || 4 – 2  || Hernandez (1–0) || Corsi (0–1) || Wells (2) || 21,418 || 45–27
|- style="text-align:center;background-color:#ffbbbb"
| 73 || June 23 || Blue Jays || 10–8 || Buice (1–0) || C. Young (2–8) || Henke (3) || 27,795 || 45–28
|- style="text-align:center;background-color:#bbffbb"
| 74 || June 24 || Blue Jays || 7–1 || Stewart (12–3) || Stieb (7–4) || || 39,659 || 46–28
|- style="text-align:center;background-color:#bbffbb"
| 75 || June 25 || Blue Jays || 6–3 || Davis (6–3) || Key (7–7) || Honeycutt (8) || 49,219 || 47–28
|- style="text-align:center;background-color:#ffbbbb"
| 76 || June 26 || @ Twins || 4 – 3  || Reardon (2–2) || Burns (4–2) || || 31,914 || 47–29
|- style="text-align:center;background-color:#ffbbbb"
| 77 || June 27 || @ Twins || 11–5 || Wayne (3–0) || Nelson (2–3) || Berenguer (2) || 37,891 || 47–30
|- style="text-align:center;background-color:#ffbbbb"
| 78 || June 28 || @ Twins || 2–0 || Viola (6–8) || Stewart (12–4) || || 41,387 || 47–31
|- style="text-align:center;background-color:#bbffbb"
| 79 || June 30 || @ Indians || 5–0 || Welch (9–4) || Swindell (10–2) || Honeycutt (9) || 27,435 || 48–31

|- style="text-align:center;background-color:#bbffbb"
| 80 || July 1 || @ Indians || 6–4 || Moore (10–5) || Yett (4–6) || Burns (5) || 18,826 || 49–31
|- style="text-align:center;background-color:#bbffbb"
| 81 || July 2 || @ Indians || 11–3 || Davis (7–3) || Farrell (4–9) || || 22,549 || 50–31
|- style="text-align:center;background-color:#bbffbb"
| 82 || July 3 || Royals || 1–0 || Stewart (13–4) || Gubicza (8–6) || Honeycutt (10) || 36,763 || 51–31
|- style="text-align:center;background-color:#ffbbbb"
| 83 || July 4 || Royals || 10–1 || Saberhagen (8–4) || M. Young (0–2) || || 46,031 || 51–32
|- style="text-align:center;background-color:#ffbbbb"
| 84 || July 5 || Royals || 12 – 9  || Crawford (1–0) || Honeycutt (1–1) || || 20,791 || 51–33
|- style="text-align:center;background-color:#bbffbb"
| 85 || July 6 || Royals || 3–1 || Moore (11–5) || Aquino (3–4) || Burns (6) || 21,985 || 52–33
|- style="text-align:center;background-color:#ffbbbb"
| 86 || July 7 || Rangers || 6–3 || Witt (7–8) || Davis (7–4) || Russell (20) || 39,678 || 52–34
|- style="text-align:center;background-color:#ffbbbb"
| 87 || July 8 || Rangers || 5 – 4  || Russell (4–2) || M. Young (0–3) || || 38,220 || 52–35
|- style="text-align:center;background-color:#bbffbb"
| 88 || July 9 || Rangers || 7–1 || Welch (10–4) || Hough (5–10) || Honeycutt (11) || 40,060 || 53–35
|- style="text-align:center;background-color:#bbffbb"
| 89 || July 13 || @ Blue Jays || 11–7 || Burns (5–2) || Key (7–9) || || 48,207 || 54–35
|- style="text-align:center;background-color:#ffbbbb"
| 90 || July 14 || @ Blue Jays || 4–1 || Stieb (9–5) || Welch (10–5) || Ward (9) || 48,325 || 54–36
|- style="text-align:center;background-color:#ffbbbb"
| 91 || July 15 || @ Blue Jays || 6–1 || Flanagan (5–6) || Stewart (13–5) || || 48,238 || 54–37
|- style="text-align:center;background-color:#bbffbb"
| 92 || July 16 || @ Blue Jays || 6–2 || Moore (12–5) || Cerutti (5–5) || Burns (7) || 48,405 || 55–37
|- style="text-align:center;background-color:#ffbbbb"
| 93 || July 17 || @ Tigers || 2–1 || Henneman (6–2) || Nelson (2–4) || || 21,844 || 55–38
|- style="text-align:center;background-color:#bbffbb"
| 94 || July 18 || @ Tigers || 7–2 || Davis (8–4) || Beard (0–1) || || 21,792 || 56–38
|- style="text-align:center;background-color:#bbffbb"
| 95 || July 20 || Orioles || 5–2 || Stewart (14–5) || Schmidt (8–9) || Eckersley (15) || 30,697 || 57–38
|- style="text-align:center;background-color:#bbffbb"
| 96 || July 21 || Orioles || 3–2 || Moore (13–5) || Olson (3–1) || || 30,848 || 58–38
|- style="text-align:center;background-color:#bbffbb"
| 97 || July 22 || Orioles || 3–1 || Welch (11–5) || Harnisch (1–3) || Eckersley (16) || 37,241 || 59–38
|- style="text-align:center;background-color:#bbffbb"
| 98 || July 23 || Orioles || 3–2 || Davis (9–4) || Ballard (11–5) || Eckersley (17) || 43,570 || 60–38
|- style="text-align:center;background-color:#ffbbbb"
| 99 || July 24 || Angels || 5–4 || Fraser (3–5) || Nelson (2–5) || Harvey (13) || 44,548 || 60–39
|- style="text-align:center;background-color:#ffbbbb"
| 100 || July 25 || Angels || 4–0 || Finley (12–6) || Stewart (14–6) || Minton (6) || 43,529 || 60–40
|- style="text-align:center;background-color:#bbffbb"
| 101 || July 26 || Angels || 9–5 || M. Young (1–3) || Witt (7–8) || || 44,588 || 61–40
|- style="text-align:center;background-color:#bbffbb"
| 102 || July 28 || Mariners || 8 – 7  || Burns (6–2) || Harris (1–4) || || 36,446 || 61–41
|- style="text-align:center;background-color:#ffbbbb"
| 103 || July 29 || Mariners || 14–6 || Johnson (5–2) || Davis (9–5) || Swift (1) || 40,734 || 61–42
|- style="text-align:center;background-color:#bbffbb"
| 104 || July 30 || Mariners || 5–3 || Stewart (15–6) || Holman (4–3) || Eckersley (18) || 43,898 || 62–42
|- style="text-align:center;background-color:#bbffbb"
| 105 || July 31 || White Sox || 3–2 || Moore (14–5) || Thigpen (1–4) || || 34,554 || 63–42

|- style="text-align:center;background-color:#bbffbb"
| 106 || August 1 || White Sox || 2–0 || C. Young (3–8) || Hibbard (2–3) || Eckersley (19) || 22,536 || 64–42
|- style="text-align:center;background-color:#bbffbb"
| 107 || August 2 || White Sox || 2–0 || Davis (10–5) || Pérez (7–12) || Honeycutt (12) || 25,146 || 65–42
|- style="text-align:center;background-color:#ffbbbb"
| 108 || August 3 || White Sox || 6–4 || Pall (4–2) || Welch (11–6) || Thigpen (23) || 31,974 || 65–43
|- style="text-align:center;background-color:#bbffbb"
| 109 || August 4 || @ Mariners || 5–3 || Stewart (16–6) || Holman (4–4) || Eckersley (20) || 23,621 || 66–43
|- style="text-align:center;background-color:#ffbbbb"
| 110 || August 5 || @ Mariners || 11–5 || Bankhead (11–4) || Moore (14–6) || Jackson (5) || 36,961 || 66–44
|- style="text-align:center;background-color:#bbffbb"
| 111 || August 6 || @ Mariners || 2–1 || Davis (11–5) || Dunne (2–6) || Eckersley (21) || 19,303 || 67–44
|- style="text-align:center;background-color:#ffbbbb"
| 112 || August 7 || @ Mariners || 5–3 || Zavaras (1–2) || Welch (11–7) || || 31,334 || 67–45
|- style="text-align:center;background-color:#bbffbb"
| 113 || August 8 || @ White Sox || 3 – 2  || Honeycutt (2–1) || Pall (4–3) || Eckersley (22) || 17,832 || 68–45
|- style="text-align:center;background-color:#ffbbbb"
| 114 || August 9 || @ White Sox || 3 – 2  || McCarthy (1–1) || Corsi (0–2) || || 15,389 || 68–46
|- style="text-align:center;background-color:#bbffbb"
| 115 || August 10 || @ White Sox || 4–1 || Davis (12–5) || Rosenberg (3–8) || Eckersley (23) || 16,173 || 69–46
|- style="text-align:center;background-color:#bbffbb"
| 116 || August 11 || @ Angels || 5–0 || Moore (15–6) || Witt (7–10) || || 61,696 || 70–46
|- style="text-align:center;background-color:#bbffbb"
| 117 || August 12 || @ Angels || 8–3 || Welch (12–7) || Abbott (10–8) || Burns (8) || 53,036 || 71–46
|- style="text-align:center;background-color:#ffbbbb"
| 118 || August 13 || @ Angels || 4–3 || Blyleven (12–2) || Stewart (16–7) || Harvey (17) || 60,326 || 71–47
|- style="text-align:center;background-color:#bbffbb"
| 119 || August 15 || Indians || 5–2 || Davis (13–5) || Nichols (3–2) || Eckersley (24) || 28,459 || 72–47
|- style="text-align:center;background-color:#ffbbbb"
| 120 || August 16 || Indians || 6–3 || Olin (1–0) || Honeycutt (2–2) || Jones (28) || 29,502 || 72–48
|- style="text-align:center;background-color:#bbffbb"
| 121 || August 17 || Indians || 1–0 || Welch (13–7) || Farrell (7–12) || Eckersley (25) || 35,071 || 73–48
|- style="text-align:center;background-color:#ffbbbb"
| 122 || August 18 || Twins || 4–3 || Smith (9–4) || Stewart (16–8) || Reardon (23) || 38,956 || 73–49
|- style="text-align:center;background-color:#bbffbb"
| 123 || August 19 || Twins || 5 – 4  || Davis (14–5) || Wayne (3–4) || || 44,123 || 74–49
|- style="text-align:center;background-color:#bbffbb"
| 124 || August 20 || Twins || 5–0 || Moore (16–6) || Anderson (14–10) || || 43,875 || 75–49
|- style="text-align:center;background-color:#bbffbb"
| 125 || August 21 || @ Tigers || 6–1 || C. Young (4–8) || Tanana (9–11) || || 6,197 || 76–49
|- style="text-align:center;background-color:#bbffbb"
| 126 || August 22 || @ Rangers || 2–0 || Welch (14–7) || Ryan (14–8) || Eckersley (26) || 42,869 || 77–49
|- style="text-align:center;background-color:#bbffbb"
| 127 || August 23 || @ Rangers || 5–4 || Stewart (17–8) || Brown (11–8) || Eckersley (27) || 23,453 || 78–49
|- style="text-align:center;background-color:#ffbbbb"
| 128 || August 24 || @ Rangers || 6–2 || Jeffcoat (7–5) || Davis (14–6) || Mielke (1) || 25,604 || 78–50
|- style="text-align:center;background-color:#ffbbbb"
| 129 || August 25 || @ Royals || 3–1 || Gubicza (12–10) || Moore (16–7) || Montgomery (14) || 38,263 || 78–51
|- style="text-align:center;background-color:#ffbbbb"
| 130 || August 26 || @ Royals || 2–0 || Saberhagen (16–5) || C. Young (4–9) || || 41,253 || 78–52
|- style="text-align:center;background-color:#bbffbb"
| 131 || August 27 || @ Royals || 6–0 || Welch (15–7) || Gordon (16–5) || || 38,263 || 79–52
|- style="text-align:center;background-color:#bbffbb"
| 132 || August 28 || @ Yankees || 7–3 || Stewart (18–8) || Hawkins (13–13) || Eckersley (28) || 25,359 || 80–52
|- style="text-align:center;background-color:#bbffbb"
| 133 || August 29 || @ Yankees || 19–5 || Davis (15–6) || Cary (3–3) || || 27,751 || 81–52
|- style="text-align:center;background-color:#ffbbbb"
| 134 || August 30 || @ Yankees || 8–5 || Plunk (5–4) || Moore (16–8) || McCullers (2) || 26,238 || 81–53

|- style="text-align:center;background-color:#ffbbbb"
| 135 || September 1 || @ Brewers || 6 – 5  || Crim (9–5) || Burns (6–3) || || 17,465 || 81–54
|- style="text-align:center;background-color:#bbffbb"
| 136 || September 2 || @ Brewers || 7–2 || Stewart (19–8) || Filer (5–3) || || 36,980 || 82–54
|- style="text-align:center;background-color:#bbffbb"
| 137 || September 3 || @ Brewers || 5–0 || Davis (16–6) || Navarro (4–7) || Nelson (2) || 30,583 || 83–54
|- style="text-align:center;background-color:#ffbbbb"
| 138 || September 4 || Red Sox || 8–5 || Dopson (10–6) || Moore (16–9) || Smith (21) || 32,697 || 83–55
|- style="text-align:center;background-color:#bbffbb"
| 139 || September 5 || Red Sox || 13–1 || C. Young (5–9) || Clemens (14–10) || || 28,541 || 84–55
|- style="text-align:center;background-color:#bbffbb"
| 140 || September 6 || Red Sox || 7–5 || Welch (16–7) || Smithson (7–14) || Eckersley (29) || 25,037 || 85–55
|- style="text-align:center;background-color:#ffbbbb"
| 141 || September 8 || Yankees || 5–1 || Mohorcic (2–1) || Stewart (19–9) || || 43,626 || 85–56
|- style="text-align:center;background-color:#bbffbb"
| 142 || September 9 || Yankees || 7–0 || Moore (17–9) || Parker (4–5) || || 43,760 || 86–56
|- style="text-align:center;background-color:#bbffbb"
| 143 || September 10 || Yankees || 6–2 || Davis (17–6) || Plunk (6–5) || || 44,071 || 87–56
|- style="text-align:center;background-color:#ffbbbb"
| 144 || September 12 || Brewers || 7–6 || August (10–11) || M. Young (1–4) || Plesac (30) || 23,862 || 87–57
|- style="text-align:center;background-color:#bbffbb"
| 145 || September 13 || Brewers || 7–6 || Eckersley (2–0) || Crim (9–6) || || 21,246 || 88–57
|- style="text-align:center;background-color:#ffbbbb"
| 146 || September 15 || @ Red Sox || 7–2 || Clemens (15–10) || Moore (17–10) || || 33,533 || 88–58
|- style="text-align:center;background-color:#ffbbbb"
| 147 || September 16 || @ Red Sox || 5–2 || Dopson (11–7) || Davis (17–7) || Lamp (1) || 33,778 || 88–59
|- style="text-align:center;background-color:#ffbbbb"
| 148 || September 17 || @ Red Sox || 7–6 || Harris (2–1) || Welch (16–8) || Smith (22) || 33,148 || 88–60
|- style="text-align:center;background-color:#bbffbb"
| 149 || September 18 || @ Indians || 4 – 2  || Eckersley (3–0) || Olin (1–3) || || 5,931 || 89–60
|- style="text-align:center;background-color:#bbffbb"
| 150 || September 19 || @ Indians || 5–1 || Moore (18–10) || Nichols (4–5) || || 6,085 || 90–60
|- style="text-align:center;background-color:#bbffbb"
| 151 || September 20 || @ Indians || 8–6 || Davis (18–7) || Swindell (13–6) || Eckersley (30) || 6,186 || 91–60
|- style="text-align:center;background-color:#bbffbb"
| 152 || September 21 || @ Twins || 2–1 || Welch (17–8) || Aguilera (2–5) || Eckersley (31) || 16,779 || 92–60
|- style="text-align:center;background-color:#bbffbb"
| 153 || September 22 || @ Twins || 5–2 || Stewart (20–9) || Dyer (3–7) || Nelson (3) || 34,830 || 93–60
|- style="text-align:center;background-color:#ffbbbb"
| 154 || September 23 || @ Twins || 5–3 || Anderson (17–10) || Moore (18–11) || Smith (1) || 38,791 || 93–61
|- style="text-align:center;background-color:#bbffbb"
| 155 || September 24 || @ Twins || 9–3 || Davis (19–7) || Tapani (2–2) || Eckersley (32) || 22,565 || 94–61
|- style="text-align:center;background-color:#ffbbbb"
| 156 || September 25 || Rangers || 3–2 || Hall (2–1) || Burns (6–4) || Russell (38) || 32,701 || 94–62
|- style="text-align:center;background-color:#bbffbb"
| 157 || September 26 || Rangers || 4–3 || Eckersley (4–0) || Jeffcoat (9–6) || || 23,119 || 95–62
|- style="text-align:center;background-color:#bbffbb"
| 158 || September 27 || Rangers || 5–0 || Moore (19–11) || Moyer (4–9) || || 32,280 || 96–62
|- style="text-align:center;background-color:#bbffbb"
| 159 || September 28 || Rangers || 5–3 || Stewart (21–9) || Arnsberg (2–1) || Eckersley (33) || 21,127 || 97–62
|- style="text-align:center;background-color:#bbffbb"
| 160 || September 29 || Royals || 4–3 || Nelson (3–5) || Luecken (2–1) || || 43,470 || 98–62
|- style="text-align:center;background-color:#ffbbbb"
| 161 || September 30 || Royals || 6–1 || Saberhagen (23–6) || Burns (6–5) || || 42,891 || 98–63

|- style="text-align:center;background-color:#bbffbb"
| 162 || October 1 || Royals || 4 – 3  || Corsi (1–2) || Leach (5–6) || || 43,755 || 99–63

Player stats

Batting

Starters by position
Note: Pos = Position; G = Games played; AB = At bats; H = Hits; Avg. = Batting average; HR = Home runs; RBI = Runs batted in

Other batters
Note: G = Games played; AB = At bats; H = Hits; Avg. = Batting average; HR = Home runs; RBI = Runs batted in

Pitching

Starting pitchers
Note: G = Games pitched; IP = Innings pitched; W = Wins; L = Losses; ERA = Earned run average; SO = Strikeouts

Other pitchers
Note: G = Games pitched; IP = Innings pitched; W = Wins; L = Losses; ERA = Earned run average; SO = Strikeouts

Relief pitchers
Note: G = Games pitched; W = Wins; L = Losses; SV = Saves; ERA = Earned run average; SO = Strikeouts

ALCS

Game 1
October 3, 1989, at Oakland–Alameda County Coliseum

Game 2
October 4, 1989, at Oakland–Alameda County Coliseum

Game 3
October 6, 1989, at SkyDome

Game 4
October 7, 1989, at SkyDome

Game 5
October 8, 1989, at SkyDome

World Series

AL Oakland Athletics (4) vs. NL San Francisco Giants (0)

Awards and honors
 Rickey Henderson, ALCS Most Valuable Player
 Dave Stewart, World Series MVP

All-Star Game
 Dave Stewart, pitcher
 Terry Steinbach, catcher, starter
 Mark McGwire, first Base, starter
 José Canseco, outfield, reserve
 Mike Moore, pitcher, reserve
 Tony La Russa, manager

Team leaders
 Games – Dave Henderson (152)
 At-Bats – Dave Henderson (579)
 Runs – Carney Lansford (81)
 Hits – Carney Lansford (185)
 Doubles – Carney Lansford (28)
 Triples – Tony Phillips (6)
 Home Runs – Mark McGwire (33)
 Runs Batted In – Dave Parker
 Walks –  Mark McGwire  (83)
 Batting average – Carney Lansford (.336)
 On Base Percentage – Rickey Henderson (.425)
 Slugging Average – José Canseco (.542)
 Stolen Bases – Rickey Henderson (52)
 Wins – Dave Stewart (21)
 Innings Pitched – Dave Stewart (257.2)
 Earned Run Average – Mike Moore (2.61)
 Strikeouts – Mike Moore (172)

Farm system

References

Notes

Sources
1989 Oakland Athletics at Baseball Reference
1989 Oakland Athletics at Baseball Almanac
Blog remembering the team and featuring images of the A's players

Oakland Athletics seasons
American League West champion seasons
American League champion seasons
World Series champion seasons
Oakland Athletics
Oakland